The state highways are arterial routes of a state, linking district headquarters and important towns within the state and connecting them with national highways or Highways of the neighboring states.

Intro
Madhya Pradesh state has a good road network. There are 46 national highways with total length of 3,714 km and many state highways with total length of 8,728 km.

New list of State Highways in Madhya Pradesh (2017)
, this is the new list of State Highways in Madhya Pradesh. 

This list is incomplete

List of State Highways in Madhya Pradesh (2009)

References

External links
Public Works Department, Government of Madhya Pradesh

 
Madhya Pradesh State Highways
State Highways